Henri Menard (born 1902, date of death unknown) was a French rower. He competed in the men's eight event at the 1924 Summer Olympics.

References

External links
 

1902 births
Year of death missing
French male rowers
Olympic rowers of France
Rowers at the 1924 Summer Olympics
Place of birth missing